Box Elder County is a county at the northwestern corner of Utah, United States. At the 2020 census, the population was 57,666, up from the 2010 figure of 49,975. Its county seat and largest city is Brigham City. The county was named for the box elder trees that abound in the county.

Box Elder County is part of the Ogden-Clearfield, UT Metropolitan Statistical Area, which is also included in the Salt Lake City-Provo-Orem, UT Combined Statistical Area. Box Elder County.

History

The county was created by the Utah Territory legislature on January 5, 1856, with the territory partitioned from Weber County. Its boundaries were altered in 1862 by adjustments between counties and in 1866 when all its area in the now-existent state of Nevada (which had gained territorial status in 1861 and statehood in 1864) was formally partitioned. The county boundaries were finally altered in 1880 by adjustments between Salt Lake and Weber counties. Its boundary has remained unchanged since 1880.

The California Trail followed Goose Creek from a point just north of the Idaho/Utah border southwest across northwestern Box Elder County to Little Goose Creek in northeastern Elko County, Nevada.
The link-up of the first transcontinental railroad occurred at Promontory Summit, Utah in 1869.

The Spiral Jetty, an earthwork sculpture by Robert Smithson, was built on the north shore of the Great Salt Lake in Box Elder County in 1970.

On November 19, 2005, sculptor Zaq Landsberg declared his plot to be independent from the US, creating the Republic of Zaqistan.

Geography
Box Elder County lies at the northwest corner of Utah. Its west border abuts the east border of the state of Nevada and its north border abuts the south border of the state of Idaho. Its territory includes large tracts of barren desert, contrasted by high, forested mountains. The Wasatch Front lies along the south-eastern border, where the main cities are found. The terrain generally slopes to the south (toward the Great Salt Lake), although the NW corner of the county slopes to the north, allowing runoff from that area to flow to the Snake River drainage. The county's highest point is a mountain ridge near the NW corner, at 9,180' (2798m) ASL. It is the fourth-largest county in Utah by area.

In the east lie the Wellsville Mountains, a branch of the Wasatch Range. In the west is a large, mostly uninhabited desert area. The Great Salt Lake lies in the southeastern corner of the county. The combined Interstate 15/Interstate 84 runs northward in the eastern part of the county. The two routes diverge at Tremonton, with I-84 heading northwest past Snowville into central and western Idaho and I-15 heading north past Plymouth and Portage into eastern Idaho.

Major highways

Adjacent counties

 Cache County - northeast
 Weber County - east
 Davis County - southeast (across Great Salt Lake)
 Tooele County - south
 Elko County, Nevada - west
 Cassia County, Idaho - northwest
 Oneida County, Idaho - north

National protected areas

 Bear River Migratory Bird Refuge
 Caribou-Targhee National Forest (part)
 Golden Spike National Historic Site
 Sawtooth National Forest (part)
 Wasatch-Cache National Forest (part)

Demographics

2000 census
As of the 2000 United States Census, there were 42,745 people, 13,144 households, and 10,804 families in the county. The population density was 7.44/sqmi (2.87/km2). There were 14,209 housing units at an average density of 2.47/sqmi (0.95/km2). The racial makeup of the county was 92.87% White, 0.17% Black or African American, 0.88% Native American, 0.96% Asian, 0.08% Pacific Islander, 3.45% from other races, and 1.60% from two or more races. 6.53% of the population were Hispanic or Latino of any race.

There were 13,144 households, of which 47.10% had children under 18 living with them, 71.00% were married couples living together, 7.90% had a female householder with no husband present, and 17.80% were non-families. Of the 13,144 households, 281 are unmarried partner households: 247 heterosexual, 22 same-sex male, and 12 same-sex female. 16.00% of all households were made up of individuals, and 7.40% had someone living alone who was 65 years of age or older. The average household size was 3.22, and the average family size was 3.63.

The county population contained 36.10% under 18, 10.50% from 18 to 24, 25.40% from 25 to 44, 17.70% from 45 to 64, and 10.40% who were 65 years of age or older. The median age was 28 years. For every 100 females, there were 101.70 males. For every 100 females aged 18 and over, there were 98.90 males.

The median income for a household in the county was $44,630, and the median income for a family was $49,421. Males had a median income of $38,814 versus $22,435 for females. The per capita income for the county was $15,625.  About 5.80% of families and 7.10% of the population were below the poverty line, including 8.30% of those under age 18 and 5.30% of those aged 65 or over.

2010 census
As of the 2010 census, there were 49,975 people, 16,058 households, and 12,891 families in the county. The population density was 8.70/sqmi (3.36/km2). There were 17,326 housing units at an average density of 3.02/sqmi (1.16/km2). The racial makeup of the county was 91.77% White, 0.34% Black or African American, 0.82% Native American, 0.89% Asian, 0.17% Pacific Islander, 3.77% from other races, and 2.24% from two or more races. 8.31% of the population were Hispanic or Latino of any race.

There were 16,058 households, out of which 41.32% had children under 18 living with them, 67.44% were married couples living together, 8.69% had a female householder with no husband present, and 19.72% were non-families. 17.16% of all households were made up of individuals, and 7.39% had someone living alone who was 65 years of age or older.  The average household size was 3.09, and the average family size was 3.50.

The county population contained 36.60% under the age of 20, 5.55% from 20 to 24, 25.37% from 25 to 44, 21.35% from 45 to 64, and 11.13% who were 65 years of age or older. The median age was 30.6 years. For every 100 females, there were 101.59 males. For every 100 females aged 18 and over, there were 96.61 males.

2015
As of 2015, the largest self-reported ancestry groups in Box Elder County were:
 26.0% were of English ancestry
 12.7% were of German ancestry
 9.3% were of American ancestry
 8.4% were of Danish ancestry
 5.5% were of Irish ancestry
 4.5% were of Scottish ancestry

Education

Elementary

 Century
 Discovery
 Fielding
 Foothill
 Garland
 Grouse Creek
 Lake View
 McKinley
 Mountain View
 North Park
 Park Valley
 Snowville
 Three Mile Creek
 Willard

Intermediate
 Alice C. Harris
 Adele C. Young

Middle
 Bear River
 Box Elder

High
 Bear River
 Box Elder
 Sunrise High School

Speciality schools
 Early Learning Center
 Independent Life Skills Center

Politics and Government
Box Elder voters are overwhelmingly Republican. In no national election since 1944 has the county selected the Democratic Party candidate, and the last Democrat to obtain one-quarter of the county's vote was Hubert Humphrey in 1968.

Communities

Cities

 Bear River City
 Brigham City (county seat)
 Corinne
 Garland
 Honeyville
 Perry
 Tremonton
 Willard

Towns

 Deweyville
 Elwood
 Fielding
 Howell
 Mantua
 Plymouth
 Portage
 Snowville

Census designated places
 Riverside
 South Willard
 Thatcher

Unincorporated communities

 Bothwell
 Collinston
 Grouse Creek
 Harper Ward
 Lynn
 Park Valley
 Penrose
 Promontory
 Yost

Ghost towns

 Blue Creek
 Cedar Creek
 Golden
 Hardup
 Jackson
 Kelton
 Kosmo
 Lucin
 Matlin
 Promontory Point
 Russian Settlement
 Saline
 Terrace
 Washakie
 Salinburg, Utah

See also

 List of counties in Utah
 National Register of Historic Places listings in Box Elder County, Utah

References

External links

 
 County Health Department

 
1856 establishments in Utah Territory
Populated places established in 1856